Sir Lloyd Erskine Sandiford, KA, PC (born 24 March 1937) is a Barbadian politician. He served as the fourth prime minister of Barbados from 1987 to 1994. Later Sir Lloyd served as Barbados' first resident ambassador in Beijing, China from 2010 to 2013.

Biography

Sandiford was born in Barbados and educated at the Coleridge and Parry School, Harrison College and the University of the West Indies in Jamaica, where he received his Bachelor of Arts in English. He then studied at Britain's University of Manchester, receiving his Master's degree in economics and social studies. Sandiford returned to Barbados, where he joined the Democratic Labour Party (DLP). In 1967, one year after independence, he was appointed to the Senate. Sandiford left the Senate to run in the 1971 election, in which he won a seat in the House of Assembly. The DLP, under Errol Barrow, formed the government; Sandiford served in many cabinet positions including as Minister of Education. The DLP lost the 1976 election to the Barbados Labour Party (BLP) and formed the opposition.

Sandiford took part in the 1976 International Visitor Leadership Program.

In 1986, the DLP was again voted into power, with Sandiford defeating BLP MP Lionel Seymour Craig in the Saint Michael South constituency. Sandiford was made Deputy Prime Minister under Barrow. In 1987, Barrow died prematurely and Sandiford was appointed as Prime Minister. He led the DLP to victory in the 1991 elections. He held the additional portfolio of Minister of Finance until 1993. In 1994 Sandiford narrowly lost a no confidence motion brought against him by the opposition when a number of members of his own party broke ranks and voted in support of the motion. Sandiford then called elections for 1994, two years before they were constitutionally due, but lost to the BLP led by Owen Arthur. He remained in parliament until 1999 when he focused on being a tutor at the Barbados Community College, where he teaches economics and Caribbean Politics.

In 2000, Sandiford was conferred the highest honour in Barbados; he was made a Knight of St. Andrew (KA) of the Order of Barbados. In April 2008 under Prime Minister David Thompson a resolution was brought to the Parliament of Barbados that the building now called the Sherbourne Conference Centre, which in fact was the idea and brainchild of Sir Lloyd, should be renamed the Sir Lloyd Erskine Sandiford Conference Centre.

Sandiford was later appointed as Barbadian Ambassador to China, presenting his credentials on 3 March 2010.

Personal life 

Sandiford's wife Angelita, Lady Sandiford is a psychologist and educator.  They have one son and two daughters.

Honours and memberships 

Co-chair of The Summit Council for World Peace, Washington, D.C. – 2011
 LL.D (Hon.) University of the West Indies – 2009
 LL.D (Hon.) Barbados Community College – 2004
 Knight of St. Andrew – 2000
 President's Medal of Excellence, Bowie State University, Bowie, Maryland, USA – 1992
 Proclaimed Honorary Citizen of City of Baltimore – 1992
 Member of Her Majesty's Privy Council – 1989
 Member of the Privy Council of Barbados – 1987
 Member of the Privy Council of the United Kingdom – 1989
 Order of the Liberator, Venezuela – 1987
 Justice of the Peace, Barbados – 1984
 Member of the Council of Freely Elected Presidents and Prime Ministers, Carter Centre, Atlanta, GA, USA
 Life Member Barbados Cricket Association
 Life Member Commonwealth Parliamentary Association

Publications

Sandiford is the author of the book The Essence of Economics: An Introductory Text (1998), and several poems, including "Ode to the Environment" and "When She Leaves You". Seven volumes of his speeches have been published. He has written many articles, and contributed a chapter entitled "The Role of the Private Sector in the Structural Adjustment Process" in the book Business, Government and Society, edited by Monya Anyadike-Danes, Eastern Caribbean Consultants, Barbados (1994). He also wrote the book Politics and Society in Barbados and the Caribbean: An Introduction (Cassia Publishing Ltd, 2000) and Fighting for the Just Society: An Autobiographical Note (2011).

References

External links

 Sir Lloyd Erskine Sandiford 4th Prime Minister of Barbados, Chattin In Manhattan Radio

1937 births
Barbadian knights
People educated at Harrison College (Barbados)
Knights Bachelor
Leaders of the Democratic Labour Party (Barbados)
Living people
Members of the Senate of Barbados
Members of the Privy Council of the United Kingdom
Prime Ministers of Barbados
Deputy Prime Ministers of Barbados
Education ministers of Barbados
Finance ministers of Barbados
Health ministers of Barbados
Social affairs ministers of Barbados
University of the West Indies alumni
Members of the House of Assembly of Barbados
Knights and Dames of St Andrew (Barbados)
Ambassadors of Barbados to China